Achabal Gardens, "the places of the princes", is a small Mughal garden located at the southeastern end of the Kashmir Valley in the town of Achabal, Anantnag district, India. The town is located near the Himalayan Mountains.

Background
The garden was built around 1620 A.D. by Mughal Empire Emperor Jahangir's wife, Nur Jahan. It was remodeled by Jahanara, who was the daughter of Shah Jahan around 1634-1640 A.D. The garden was rebuilt, following decay, on a smaller scale by Gulab Singh and it is now a public garden. A main feature of the garden is a waterfall that enters into a pool of water.

This place is also noted for its spring, which is said to be the re-appearance of a portion of the river Bringhi, whose waters suddenly disappear through a large fissure underneath a hill at the village Wani Divalgam in the Brang Pargana. It is said that in order to test this, a quantity of chaff was thrown in the Bringhi river at a place its water disappears at Wani Divalgam and that chaff came out of the Achabal spring. The water of the spring issues from several places near the foot of a low spur which is densely covered with deodar trees and at one place it gushes out from an oblique fissure large enough to admit a man's body and forms a volume some 18 inches high and about a foot in diameter.

Gallery

References

Further reading 
 Brookes, John. (1987). Gardens of Paradise: History and Design of the Great Islamic Gardens. London: Weidenfeld & Nicolson.
 Crowe, Sylvia; Haywood, S.; Jellicoe, S.; Patterson, G. (1972). The Gardens of Mughal India. London: Thames and Hudson.
 Petruccioli, Attilio. "Gardens and Religious Topography in Kashmir." Environmental Design. 1-2 (1991):64-73.

External links 
 Achabal Gardens

Gardens in Jammu and Kashmir
Tourist attractions in Anantnag district
1620s establishments in India
Mughal gardens in India